Old Mother Riley's Ghosts is a 1941 British comedy film directed by John Baxter and starring Arthur Lucan, Kitty McShane and John Stuart. It was the 8th in the long-running Old Mother Riley series. Old Mother Riley inherits a castle in Scotland, but it appears to be haunted.

Plot summary
Old Mother Riley inherits a Scottish property, believing it, at first, to be a pub, and makes the journey up north with her daughter, Kitty. They are surprised to find themselves in possession of a  haunted castle, though it turns out the ghouls and ghosties are not what they seem. They are in fact an ingenious front for an espionage ring anxious to get their hands on an inventor's plans, and trying to scare intruders away. After vigorous attempts to scare Mother Riley out of her wits, the Irish washerwoman ends up turning the tables on the spies, and terrifying them in return.

Cast
 Arthur Lucan ...  Mrs. Riley
 Kitty McShane ...  Kitty Riley
 John Stuart ...  John Cartwright
 A. Bromley Davenport ...  Warrender
 Dennis Wyndham ...  Jem
 John Laurie ...  McAdam
 Peter Gawthorne ...  Mr. Cartwright

Critical reception
TV Guide wrote, "sure to garner a couple of hearty laughs...Some fun "scares" (a knight whose head flies off) help pass the time."

References

External links

1941 films
1941 comedy films
1940s English-language films
Films directed by John Baxter
British comedy films
Films set in London
British black-and-white films
Films shot at British National Studios
1940s British films